The 1928 Brooklyn Robins finished in 6th place, despite pitcher Dazzy Vance leading the league in strikeouts for a seventh straight season as well as posting a career best 2.09 ERA.

Offseason 
 December 12, 1928: Johnny Butler was purchased from the Robins by the Chicago Cubs.

Regular season

Season standings

Record vs. opponents

Notable transactions 
 June 8, 1928: Charlie Hargreaves was traded by the Robins to the Pittsburgh Pirates for Joe Harris and Johnny Gooch.
 June 23, 1928: Howard Freigau was purchased from the Robins by the Boston Braves.

Roster

Player stats

Batting

Starters by position 
Note: Pos = Position; G = Games played; AB = At bats; R = Runs; H = Hits; Avg. = Batting average; HR = Home runs; RBI = Runs batted in; SB = Stolen bases

Other batters 
Note: G = Games played; AB = At bats; R = Runs; H = Hits; Avg. = Batting average; HR = Home runs; RBI = Runs batted in; SB = Stolen bases

Pitching

Starting pitchers 
Note: G = Games pitched; GS = Games started; CG = Complete games; IP = Innings pitched; W = Wins; L = Losses; ERA = Earned run average; BB = Bases on balls; SO = Strikeouts

Other pitchers 
Note: G = Games pitched; GS = Games started; CG = Complete games; IP = Innings pitched; W = Wins; L = Losses; ERA = Earned run average; BB = Bases on balls; SO = Strikeouts

Relief pitchers 
Note: G = Games pitched; IP = Innings pitched; W = Wins; L = Losses; SV = Saves; ERA = Earned run average; BB = Bases on balls; SO = Strikeouts

Awards and honors

League top five finishers 
Del Bissonette
 #4 in NL in home runs (25)

Watty Clark
 #4 in NL in ERA (2.68)

Dazzy Vance
 MLB leader in ERA (2.09)
 MLB leader in strikeouts (200)
 #3 in NL in wins (22)

Notes

References 
Baseball-Reference season page
Baseball Almanac season page
Retrosheet

External links 
1928 Brooklyn Robins uniform
Brooklyn Dodgers reference site
Acme Dodgers page 

Los Angeles Dodgers seasons
Brooklyn Robins season
Brooklyn
1920s in Brooklyn
Flatbush, Brooklyn